The Wandle River is a river of the north Canterbury region of New Zealand's South Island. The Mount Lyford Alpine Resort lies close to the river's source, Lake Stella.

See also
List of rivers of New Zealand

References

Rivers of Canterbury, New Zealand
Rivers of New Zealand